The America was a Spanish automobile manufactured in Barcelona from 1917 to 1922.  The four-cylinder "valveless" model, the "Tipo A", had a primitive synchromesh gearbox and worm final drive.  The firm's main product was the 1097cc "Tipo B"; the "Tipo C" was an ohv racing model.

Vintage vehicles
Defunct motor vehicle manufacturers of Spain
Companies based in Barcelona